Ancylolomia saharae is a moth in the family Crambidae. It was described by Patrice J.A. Leraut in 2012. It is found in Mauritania.

References

Ancylolomia
Moths described in 2012
Moths of Africa